The 880th Bombardment Squadron is a former United States Army Air Forces unit.  It was an early Boeing B-29 Superfortress unit, but was inactivated in the spring of 1944 when the Army Air Forces reorganized its very heavy bomber units.  It was reactivated in August 1944 and deployed to the Pacific in 1945, but arrived too late to see combat.  The squadron returned to the United States in December and was inactivated.

History
The squadron was activated at Davis-Monthan Field, Arizona in November 1943 as one of the original four squadrons of the 499th Bombardment Group.  Ten days later, a cadre moved to Smoky Hill Army Air Field, Kansas to begin Boeing B-29 Superfortress very heavy bomber training.  The 879th trained in Kansas with early model B-29s, with frequent delays in training due to modifications of the aircraft correcting production deficiencies.  In May 1944, the Army Air Forces reorganized its very heavy bomber units, reducing them from four to three operational squadrons.  The 880th was inactivated in this reorganization.

The squadron was activated again three months later at Dalhart Army Air Field, Texas, where it was assigned to the 383d Bombardment Group.  Shortages of B-29s for training caused the 383d and the squadron to remain in the United States for almost a year until finally it deployed to the Central Pacific Area in August 1945.  By the time the squadron arrived at West Field (Tinian) in September, hostilities in the Pacific had ended and it did not see combat.  The squadron returned to the United States in December and was inactivated at the port of embarkation.

Lineage
 Constituted as the 880th Bombardment Squadron, Very Heavy on 19 November 1943
 Activated on 20 November 1943
 Inactivated on 10 May 1944
 Activated on 28 August 1944
 Inactivated on 3 January 1946

Assignments
 499th Bombardment Group, 20 November 1943–10 May 1944
 383d Bombardment Group, 28 August 1944 – 3 January 1946

Stations
 Davis-Monthan Field, Arizona, 20 November 1943
 Smoky Hill Army Air Field, Kansas, 1 December 1943
 Clovis Army Air Field, New Mexico, 11 February 1944
 Smoky Hill Army Air Field, Kansas, 8 April–10 May 1944
 Dalhart Army Air Field, Texas, 28 August 1944
 Walker Army Air Field, Kansas, 14 January–11 August 1945
 West Field (Tinian), Mariana Islands, 12 September–19 Dec 1945
 Camp Anza, California, 2–3 January 1946

Aircraft
 Boeing B-17 Flying Fortress, 1944
 B-29 Superfortress, 1944, 1945

Campaigns

See also

 B-17 Flying Fortress units of the United States Army Air Forces
 List of B-29 Superfortress operators

References

Notes

Bibliography

 
 

Strategic bombing squadrons of the United States Army Air Forces
Military units and formations established in 1943